Nesta (formerly NESTA, National Endowment for Science, Technology and the Arts) is an innovation foundation in the United Kingdom.

The organisation acts through a combination of programmes, investment, policy and research, as well as the formation of partnerships to promote innovation across a broad range of sectors.

Nesta was originally funded by a £250 million endowment from the UK National Lottery. The endowment is managed through a trust, and Nesta uses the interest from the trust to meet its charitable objects and to fund and support its projects.

The charity is registered in England and Wales with charity no. 1144091 and in Scotland with no. SC042833. Nesta states its purpose is to bring bold ideas to life to change the world for good.

History

NESTA was set up in 1998 by an independent endowment established by an Act of Parliament, the National Lottery Act 1998. It had been a Labour Party manifesto promise. In 2002 it was awarded £95 million.

In October 2010, the Government announced that it would transfer NESTA's previous status from an executive non-departmental public body to a new charitable body.

On 1 April 2012, NESTA transitioned from being an executive to a charitable body, shortening its name to "Nesta".

Operations
In 2021, Nesta announced a new ten-year strategy, that would be focused on three major areas: childhood inequality, public health and a sustainable economy.

Notable people
Sir John Gieve chairs the organisation. Ravi Gurumurthy is the organisation's Chief Executive.

Former chief executives include (from 2005) Jonathan Kestenbaum, Baron Kestenbaum, chief operating officer of investment trust RIT Capital Partners, and a Labour member of the House of Lords.

See also
Behavioural Insights Team
Co-production (public services)
Hidden innovation

References

External links
 Nesta official website
 Nesta strategy 2017-2020

Charities based in London
Innovation in the United Kingdom
Innovation organizations
1998 establishments in the United Kingdom
Organisations based in the City of London
Research and development in the United Kingdom
Science advocacy organizations
Science and technology in Dundee
Science and technology in London
Scientific organizations established in 1998
Scientific organisations based in the United Kingdom